The Pacific Northwest water resource region is one of 21 major geographic areas, or regions, in the first level of classification used by the United States Geological Survey to divide and sub-divide the United States into successively smaller hydrologic units. These geographic areas contain either the drainage area of a major river, or the combined drainage areas of a series of rivers.

This region includes the drainage within the United States that ultimately discharges into: (a) the Strait of Georgia and of Strait of Juan de Fuca, and (b) the Pacific Ocean within the states of Oregon and Washington; and that part of the Great Basin whose discharge is into the state of Oregon. Includes all of Washington and parts of California, Idaho, Montana, Nevada, Oregon, Utah, and Wyoming.

List of water resource subregions

See also
List of rivers in the United States
Water resource region

References

Lists of drainage basins
Drainage basins
Watersheds of the United States
Regions of the United States
 Resource
Water resource regions